Alzate Brianza is a comune (municipality) in the Province of Como in the Italian region Lombardy, located about  north of Milan and about  southeast of Como.

References

External links
 Official website

Cities and towns in Lombardy